Robert Arthur may refer to:

Robert Arthur Jr. (1909–1969), American novelist and radio scriptwriter
Robert Arthur (film producer) (1909–1986), American film producer
Robert Arthur (radio announcer) (1921–1997), of "Ken and Bob Show"
Robert Alan Aurthur (1922–1978), American screenwriter, director and TV producer
Robert Arthur (actor) (1925–2008), American actor
Robert Arthur (cricketer) (1866–1948), Barbadian cricketer
Bobby Arthur (born 1945), English boxer
Gordon Arthur (bishop) (Robert Gordon Arthur, 1909–1992), Anglican bishop in Australia